Moema may refer to:
 Moema (Victor Meirelles), 1866 painting
 Moema, Minas Gerais, a municipality in Brazil
 Moema (district of São Paulo), a district in Brazil
 Moema (São Paulo Metro), a metro station
 Moema (fish), a genus of killifish 
 Beraba moema, a beetle of family Cerambycidae
 Recchia moema, a beetle of family Cerambycidae
Sem Moema, British politician